Parinoush Saniee is an Iranian novelist. Her novel The Book of Fate has been translated into 26 languages and the English translation by Sara Khalili was listed by World Literature Today as one of the "75 notable translations of 2013". The Italian edition earned Saniee the 2010 Boccaccio Prize.

Works
Saniee's works include:
 Sahm-e man ("My Share", 2003)
Italian translation by N. G. Monsef and Sepideh Rouhi, Quello che mi spetta (2010)
English translation by Sara Khalili, The Book of Fate (2013)
German translation by Bettina Friedrich, Was mir zusteht (2013)
Japanese translation by Syoichi Nasu, Shiawase no Zanzou (2013)
Norwegian translation by Nina Zandjani, Det som ventet meg (2013)
Korean translation by Heo Jieun, Naui Mok (2013)
Spanish translation by Gemma Rovira Ortega, El libro de mi destino (2014)
Bulgarian translation by Lyudmila Yaneva, Моята орис (2014)
Finnish translation by Anna Lönnroth, Kohtalon kirja (2014)
French translation by Odile Demange, Le Voile de Téhéran (2015)
 Azerbaijanian translation by Masuma Shukurzadeh, Mənim Payım (2016)
Swedish translation by Namdar Nasser, Det som väntar mig (2020)
 Pedar-e aan digari ("Father of the Other One")
Norwegian translation by Nina Zandjani, Den stumme gutten (2014)
Bulgarian translation by Lyudmila Yaneva, Бащата на другия (2015)
Roumanian translation by Cristina Ciovarnache, "Tatal celuilalt copil", ed Polirom 2013
 Range-e Hambastegee
 Anhaa ke Raftand va Anha ke Mandand

See also 
List of Iranian women writers

References

The National 17 July 2014 (UAE) - Opening minds in Iran’s closed society through Parinoush Saniee’s best-seller 
Gulf News 30 May 2013 (UAE) - Review: The Book of Fate 
Daily Telegraph 2 January 2013 (UK) - Literary preview of 2013, Melissa Katsoulis surveys another busy year ahead in the world of books

External links
Profile at agency website, accessed 7 January 2015.

Persian women writers
21st-century novelists
Iranian women novelists
Iranian novelists
21st-century Iranian women writers
Living people
Year of birth missing (living people)